= Marathakkara =

- town
- Location in Kerala, India
- Coordinates: 10°28′30″N 76°15′10″E
- Country: India
- State: Kerala
- District: Thrissur

Government
  - Body: Puthur Grama Panchayath

Population (2001)
  - Total: 17,934

Languages
  - Official: Malayalam, English
- Time zone: UTC+5:30 (IST)
- Vehicle registration: KL-08
- Coastline: 0 kilometres (0 mi)

Marathakkara is a census town in Thrissur district in the Indian state of Kerala.

== Demographics ==
As of 2001 India census, Marathakkara had a population of 17,934. Males constitute 49% of the population and females 51%. Marathakkara has an average literacy rate of 81%, higher than the national average of 59.5%: male literacy is 83%, and female literacy is 79%. In Marathakkara, 12% of the population is under 6 years of age.
